Golden Boy is an album by Quincy Jones which was released by Mercury in 1964. The album includes three versions of the theme from the musical Golden Boy with three original compositions and jazz versions of pop hits.

Reception

Allmusic's Scott Yanow wrote: "This Quincy Jones big-band LP finds him exploring a wide variety of material in hopes of finding a hit.  ... There are some spots for trumpeters Freddie Hubbard and Joe Newman, altoist Phil Woods, guitarist Jim Hall, and the tough tenor of Eddie "Lockjaw" Davis, but the brevity of the selections (all but 'Django' are between two and four minutes) and the conservative nature of many of the charts keep the music from taking any real chances".

Track listing
All compositions by Quincy Jones except where noted
 "Theme from Golden Boy" [String Version] (Charles Strouse, Lee Adams) – 2:47
 "The Witching Hour" – 3:40
 "Seaweed" – 2:24
 "Golden Boy" (Strouse, Adams) – 3:10
 "Django" (John Lewis) – 4:58
 "Soul Serenade" (Curtis Ousley, Luther Dixon) – 3:44
 "Theme From Golden Boy" [Big Band Version] (Strouse, Adams) – 3:54
 "Hard Day's Night" (John Lennon, Paul McCartney) – 3:24
 "The Sidewinder" (Lee Morgan) – 3:40
 "The Midnight Sun Will Never Set" (Jones, Henri Salvador, Dorcas Cochran) – 3:08

Personnel

Performance
Quincy Jones – arranger, conductor with orchestra including:
Freddie Hubbard, Joe Newman, Johnny Foske, Dick Hurwitz − trumpet
Al Grey, Billy Byers, Paul Faulise, Quentin Jackson, Bill Watrous − trombone
James Buffington, Morris Secon − French horn
Jerome Richardson − flute, soprano saxophone, alto saxophone, tenor saxophone
Phil Woods − alto saxophone
Frank Foster − tenor saxophone, flute
Eddie "Lockjaw" Davis − tenor saxophone
George Dessinger, Stan Webb − tenor saxophone, clarinet
Billy Slapin − clarinet, flute
Cecil Payne − baritone saxophone
Jim Hall − guitar
Margaret Ross − harp
Bobby Scott − piano
Don Elliott − vibraphone, marimba, vocals
Art Davis, Bob Cranshaw, Milt Hinton − bass
Ed Shaughnessy, Grady Tate − drums
Al Brown, Archie Levin, Charles McCracken, David Mankovitz, David Schwartz, George Ricci, Harold Coletta, Harry Lookofsky, Julien Barber, Karen Tuttle, Kermit Moore, Maurice Bialkin, Selwart Clarke, Ted Israel – string section

References

1964 albums
Quincy Jones albums
Albums arranged by Quincy Jones
Albums conducted by Quincy Jones
Albums produced by Quincy Jones
Mercury Records albums